Lake Shilloi is a natural lake in Phek District, Nagaland. It is the largest natural lake in Nagaland. It falls in a valley surrounded with pine forests.

Name
The  name of the lake is originally Lütsam meaning ‘a place where water is collected’. It was known as Shiloh by the British during the British era but today it is officially known as Shilloi.

References

Shilloi
Shilloi